Nibbiano is a former comune (municipality) in the Province of Piacenza in the Italian region Emilia-Romagna. On 1 January, it was merged with Caminata and Pecorara into the new comune of Alta Val Tidone.

Nibbiano was founded as a castle, whose first known mention is in 1029 document. The nearby castle of Trebecco is mentioned for the first time in 971.
 
 

Cities and towns in Emilia-Romagna